Lyka may refer to:
 917 Lyka, a minor planet orbiting the Sun
 Antal Lyka (1908-1976), a Hungarian football player and coach
 Lyka (wasp), a wasp genus in the family Encyrtidae

See also
Laika, space dog